Helen Sherman Griffith (1873 - July 13, 1961) was an American author. An Iowan, she was  the "prolific" author of the Letty Grey series of children's books, published by Penn Publishing Company of Philadelphia. She was the daughter of Hoyt Sherman and Sara Sherman, who was born and raised in Des Moines, Iowa at Hoyt Sherman Place.  Helen's bedroom has been restored and is part of the Hoyt Sherman Place house museum.

In 1914 she paid a visit to Des Moines Women's Club which was located in Hoyt Sherman Place, her childhood home.  An article in the Des Moines Register captured the occasion: "It was at the close of the program that Mrs. Cowles told the delightful news that the Women's Club... board... had voted to dedicate the auditorium on the second floor of the club house to Mrs. Helen Sherman Griffith.  It was the same room the Mrs. Griffith, then known to her friends as Nellie Sherman, passed her girlhood days and dreamed her dreams and wove her fancies - dreams and fancies that have since taken more permanent form in delightful stories of children and young folks."

She wrote three plays in 1899: The Minister's Wife, The Burglar Alarm, and A Borrowed Luncheon. She had quips published in Lippincott's Monthly Magazine. Her novel for adults, The Lane, was a bestseller in the 1920s.

Bibliography
Her Father's Legacy (1901), illustrated by Ida Waugh
A Story for Girls (1902) illustrated by Ida Waugh
Social Aspirations (1903)
For Love Or Money; a Comedy in Three Acts (1903)
The Merry Widow Hat: A Farce in One Act for Female Characters (1909)
Reflected Glory: A Farce in One Act (for Female Characters) (1909)
Letty of the Circus (1910) illustrated by Francis D. Jones Penn Publishing Company
A Fallen Idol: A Farce in One Act (1911)
Rosemary for Remembrance (1911), illustrated by Mary Pemberton Ginthier, Penn Publishing Company
A Wilful Girl (1911)
Letty's Sister (1912) Penn Publishing Company
Letty's Treasure (1913), illustrated by Francis D. Jones, Penn Publishing Company
Letty's Good Luck (1914), illustrated by Francis D. Jones, Penn Publishing Company
Letty at the Conservatory (1915) illustrated by Paula B. Himmelsbach, Penn Publishing Company
Letty's Springtime (1916),   illustrated by Paula B. Himmelsbach, Penn Publishing Company
Letty and Miss Grey (1917), illustrated by Paula Himmelsbach Balano. Penn Publishing Company.
Letty Grey - Heiress (1918), illustrated by Paula Himmelsbach Balano, Penn Publishing Company
Her Service Flag: A Play in One Act (1918)
The Knitting Club Meets Or Just Back from France: A Comedy in One Act (1918)
Getting the Range: A War Play in Ome Act (1918)
Letty's New Home (1920), illustrated by Francis D. Jones, Penn Publishing Company
The Over-Alls Club: A Farce in One Act (1920), Walter H. Baker & Co.  9781173577186
Yes, Virginia!
No, Virginia! (1921)
Why, Virginia (1924), illustrated by Wuanita Smith
Louie Maude (1924)
The Roly Poly family (1924)
The Lane (1925) Penn Publishing Companh
The Ladies Strike, A Play for Girls, in One Act (1921)

References

1873 births
1961 deaths
Writers from Iowa
20th-century American women writers